Conversation Piece may refer to:

Conversation Piece (Jewellery and Object) by Beatrice Brovia and Nicolas Cheng (since 2011-)
conversation piece, an informal group portrait in painting
Conversation Piece (musical) by Noël Coward (1934)
"Conversation Piece" (song), by David Bowie (1970)
Conversation Piece (box set), by David Bowie (2019)
Conversation Piece (film), by Luchino Visconti (1974)
Conversation Piece, an album by the post-hardcore band A Lot Like Birds (2011)